Mercedes de Jesús Molina (Maria Mercedes de Jesus Molina y Ayala; 24 September 1828 – 12 June 1883) is a Roman Catholic blessed from Baba, Ecuador. She was a missionary who devoted her life to the care of abandoned children and founded the order of the Sisters of Mariana de Jesús. She was beatified by Pope John Paul II on 1 February 1985.

Biography
Mercedes de Jesús Molina was born on 24 September 1828 in Baba, Los Ríos Province, Ecuador. She was the daughter of Miguel Molina y Arbeláez and Rosa Ayala y Aguilar. After the death of her father, two years later, Mercedes and her mother moved to Guayaquil. Then at the age of fifteen Mercedes suffered the death of her mother. A bad fall from a horse brought about her conversion to absolute piety and strict penance. From then on she devoted her life to care of abandoned children. She did this first as mother and teacher to orphans in Guayaquil then in Cuenca, where she shared a home with Narcisa de Jesús. Mercedes later volunteered her services to the Jesuits to assist in the conversion of the Jivaroan peoples. After the missionaries had to give up their mission territory, Mercedes settled in Riobamba. There she took vows of poverty, chasity and obedience and founded the Sisters of Mariana de Jesús, named after Mariana de Jesús, on 14 April 1873. This institute provided care orphans, converts, and women who had been released from prison. She died ten years later in Riobamba on 12 June 1883. Mercedes was beatified on 1 February 1985 by Pope John Paul II in Guayaquil.

....

References

1828 births
1883 deaths
19th-century Ecuadorian people
Ecuadorian Roman Catholic Blesseds
Beatifications by Pope John Paul II
Venerated Catholics by Pope John Paul II
19th-century Ecuadorian women